Metriochroa latifoliella is a moth of the family Gracillariidae. It is known from the Mediterranean region.

The larvae feed on Olea europaea, Phillyrea angustifolia and Phillyrea latifolia. They mine the leaves of their host plant. The mine consists of a corridor that makes a loop through the entire leaf. It is very narrow where it begins, becoming quite wide in the end. There are large amounts of frass and only the margins remain free of frass and are transparent. Pupation takes place in a silken cocoon at the end of the mine.

References

Phyllocnistinae
Moths of Europe